Dark Secret is a novel written by American author Christine Feehan.

Plot introduction

Rafael De La Cruz has spent centuries hunting vampires with his brothers, and with each passing year his capacity to feel emotions has grown weaker and weaker until finally there's barely been a memory left-until only sheer willpower keeps him from turning into the very abomination he hunts. But it'll take more than will to keep him away from the woman who is meant to be his and his alone...

For five years, rancher Colby Jansen has been the sole protector of her younger half-siblings, and with fierce determination and work she has kept her family together and the ranch operational. Now, the De La Cruz brothers are threatening that stability. Colby was illegitimate, but she viewed Armando Chevez as her father.  The Chevez family have worked closely with De La Cruz family for centuries. When Armando Chevez married Colby's mother the Chevez family patriarch was displeased and disinherited Armando. A plane crash left Colby's mother dead and Armando paralyzed. On his death bed, Armando, wrote to his family for aid but went unanswered. Now, several years after Armando's death, the Chevez families patriarch has died as well and the letters from Armando are uncovered. The Chevez family want very much to heal the tear in their family and want custody of Colby's younger brother Paul and sister Ginny. Colby vows to fight them-after all she believes that they left Armando to suffer and die without so much as a letter.

Unable to reconcile with Colby the Chevez family have gone to the De La Cruz brothers for aid. Enter Rafael and Nicholas De La Cruz. Nicholas pretty much scares Colby to death and she marks him as dangerous. But Rafael frightens her on another level for he is after more than her family-he wants Colby and will not let anything stand between them. After ages of loneliness, the raw desire to possess her overwhelms his very soul, driving him to claim her as his life mate, though she has nothing to do with him. She believes that he is nothing but a rich playboy and is trying to seduce her to steal her brother and sister from her.

But Colby has another problem, for several years, she's been assisted on the ranch by an old cow hand named Pete Jessup, who is now missing. Several days after the De La Cruz brothers show up she goes to search the outskirts of the ranch and finds him murdered. Colby is horrified and confused as to who and why someone would do such a thing. But Rafael and Nicholas, both powerful Carpathians, immediately realize that a vampire, the most vilest of all creatures, is to blame. This triggers Rafael defensive instincts and his intense need to protect Colby at all costs, even against her will.

Their relationship is fragile and tenuous. Colby believes he's out to get her brother and sister, and Rafael, an ancient Carpathian hunter, is completely clueless with dealing with a modern, fiercely independent woman. It is revealed that Colby has strong psychic talents and for a while she believes that Rafael might just be special as she is. Then she is forced to confront the knowledge that he's from a different species entirely. And to make matters worse the vampire begins to attack her family and she is forced to accept the knowledge that vampires of myth really do exist. When Colby's younger brother Paul is attacked by the vampire, Rafael recognizes him as an old boyhood friend, Kirja Malinov. Only when Rafael faces off and nearly dies defending her and her family from Kirja does Colby let herself realize her feelings for Rafael.

Awards and nominations

Made The Following Bestseller Lists:

New York Times 
Amazon
Publishers Weekly
USA Today 
Barnes & Noble Mass Market
Barnes & Noble Romance
Barnes & Noble Online
B Daltons
Borders 
Bookscan 
Waldenbooks Mass Market
Waldenbooks
Walmart

External links
Read Prologue
Read Chapter 1

2005 American novels
Novels by Christine Feehan
American vampire novels